is a passenger railway station located in the city of Akishima, Tokyo, Japan, operated by East Japan Railway Company (JR East).

Lines
Akishima Station is served by the Ōme Line from Tachikawa to Ōme, with direct services to and from Tokyo via the Chūō Line (Rapid). It is located 5.0 kilometers from the starting point of the line at Tachikawa Station.

Station layout
The station consists of a single island platform serving two tracks, with an elevated station building located above the tracks and platforms. The station is staffed.

Platforms

History
It was renamed Akishima Station on 1 October 1959. With the privatization of Japanese National Railways (JNR) on 1 April 1987, the station came under the control of JR East.

Passenger statistics
In fiscal 2019, the station was used by an average of 26,016 passengers daily (boarding passengers only).

The passenger figures for previous years are as shown below.

Surrounding area
 Showa Aircraft Industry
Akishima Post Office

See also
 List of railway stations in Japan

References

External links

 JR East station information 

Railway stations in Tokyo
Railway stations in Japan opened in 1938
Akishima, Tokyo
Ōme Line